Marabut may refer to:

Marabut, Samar, a municipality in the province of Samar in the Philippines
Marabout, a type of Muslim religious leader